is a fictional character in the Japanese manga and animated series of the same name created by Fujiko F. Fujio. Doraemon is a male robotic earless cat that travels back in time from the 22nd century to aid a preteen boy named Nobita. An official birth certificate for the character gives him a birth date of 3 September 2112 and lists his city of residency as Kawasaki, Kanagawa, the city where the manga was created. In 2008, Japan's Foreign Ministry appointed Doraemon the country's "anime ambassador".

Creation and conception 
Doraemon was originally conceived by Hiroshi Fujimoto following a series of three events. Firstly, when searching for ideas for a new manga, he wished that a machine existed that would come up with ideas for him. Secondly, he tripped over his daughter's toy. Thirdly, he heard cats fighting in his neighborhood.

The name, "Doraemon", can be translated roughly to "stray". Unusually, the name  is written in a mixture of two Japanese scripts: Katakana and Hiragana.

Characteristics
Doraemon's physical appearance changed as the manga progressed. At first, he was predominantly kingfish color, with a blue tail, a white stomach, and flesh-colored hands and feet. He also stooped, and had a body much larger than his head. In later issues, he sported a smaller body, white hands and feet, and a red tail — the appearance most identify him with today. In the 1995 short film 2112: The Birth of Doraemon (as well as the The Doraemons story arc set in the Robot School), it is revealed that Doraemon's original paint color was yellow, and had a high-pitched voice than his current counterpart. After getting his ears gnawed off by a robot mouse at the 22nd century Nobi's residence, he slipped into depression on top of a tower, where he erroneously drank a potion labeled "sadness" instead of "happiness". As he wept, the yellow color washed off and his voice changed due to the potion. As a result, he developed a morbid fear of mice despite being a robotic cat. Doraemon often becomes enraged when he is mistaken for a raccoon dog due to his missing ears, which is a running gag in the series.

Doraemon is considered a substandard product because many of his robotic features (i.e. radar whiskers and cat-calling bell) malfunctioned after production due to an accident in the factory while he was being built. Due to this malfunction, Doraemon did not do well at the robot's school and during the final presentation show, he performed badly and nobody wanted to hire him, until baby Sewashi pushed the button. His parents were a bit reluctant, but since Sewashi liked him, they hired Doraemon, and he took care of him until Sewashi himself sent him to the past to take care of Nobita. Despite this, Doraemon shows a lot of intelligence and common sense. Whenever he hangs out with his friend, Mii-Chan (a cute street cat), he calls it 'important work' as an excuse for not doing chores that Nobita's mother asks him to do. As a robot, Doraemon can be programmed to complete a task by pushing a button on his nose, and can even shut down if his tail is pulled. In a few episodes, Doraemon has been shown to be in danger of factory-resting, or being on the verge of breaking.

While it might explain the origin of his name, it was revealed in one of the manga chapters that his name originates from the Japanese word  for "stray cat", and the  ending which is part of traditional Japanese names, as seen also in, for example, Ishikawa Goemon.

Appearances

Doraemon 
Doraemon is sent back in time by a young boy named Sewashi Nobi to improve the circumstances of his great-great-grandfather, Nobita, so that his descendants may enjoy a better future. In the original timeline, Nobita experienced nothing but misery and misfortune manifested in the form of very poor grades and bullying throughout his life. This culminates in the burning down of a future business he sets up which leaves his family line beset with financial problems. In order to alter history and better the Nobi family's fortunes, Sewashi initially wanted to send a super-robot to protect Nobita, but with his meager allowance he could only afford an imperfectly-made factory-rejected toy: an anthropomorphic robot cat called Doraemon. 

The 1995 short film, 2112: The Birth of Doraemon, shows his original appearance; when he was first manufactured, Doraemon had ears and was painted yellow, but he turned blue after sobbing because rats ate his ears. According to the 1995 short film, he is coated and scented with eggs, which gave him the yellow skin color.

In other media 
French actor Jean Reno portrayed Doraemon in several live-action television commercials throughout 2011 and 2016. The advertisement's were created by Toyota and depict the series' characters two decades after they "grow up".

Doraemon appeared at the Tokyo video showcase at the 2016 Summer Olympics closing ceremony in anime form with his fellow anime characters Nobita, Shizuka, Gian, Suneo and other famous Japanese characters such as Captain Tsubasa, Pac-Man & Hello Kitty. He later appeared at the video where he helped prime minister Shinzō Abe (dressed up as Mario) by planting a Warp Pipe from Shibuya Crossing to Maracanã Stadium.

Reception 
In terms of popularity the character has been compared to Walt Disney's Mickey Mouse, and the character is considered to be an iconic figure in Japan. The character has received criticism in mainland Chinese media outlets where they considered Doraemon to be a politically subversive character and that it was a tool of Japan's “cultural invasion". In 2019, a resolution was made in the Pakistan assembly to ban Doremon claiming that it has  "harmful impact on children". In his book Japan Pop: Inside the World of Japanese Popular Culture, author Timothy J. Craig wrote that the character of Doraemon "Though Doraemon is himself a high-tech product, he possesses an endearing personality that captivates young audiences. He is both a full member of Nobita's family and an intimate friend to Nobita and his companions. Portrayed in this way, Doraemon represents the optimistic view of the relationship between technology and humanity."

In a survey conducted by the Oricon in 2007 among 1,000 people, Doraemon was ranked as the second strongest manga character of all time, behind only Dragon Ball protagonist Son Goku.

In 2008 the character of Doraemon was appointed as an "anime ambassador" to help promote Japanese anime worldwide and in 2013 Doraemon was considered to be the most popular character among Japanese children in a survey held by Video Research Ltd, a position the character had held in the survey since June 2009. On The Wall Street Journal Japan Real Time, Toko Sekiguchi called it "arguably the most beloved cartoon character in Japan". Google Japan utilized Doraemon in its Google Doodle for 3 September 2009, in celebration of the character's 40th birthday.

In 2012, Hong Kong celebrated the birthday of Doraemon 100 years early with a series of displays of the character.

Politician Osamu Fujimura is known as the "Doraemon of Nagatacho" due to his figure and warm personality. Sumo wrestler Takamisugi was nicknamed "Doraemon" because of his resemblance to the character.
ESP Guitars, has also made several Doraemon shaped guitars.

During 2014, Doraemon was featured on the cover of all 51 magazines published by Shogakukan.

References

External links 
  
  
 Doraemon official website at Asahi TV 
 Iyer, Pico (2002). "The Cuddliest Hero in Asia". Time Asia.
  

Doraemon characters
Fictional cats
Fictional robots
Time travelers
Comics characters introduced in 1969
Male characters in anime and manga
Fictional inventors
Fictional people from the 22nd-century